Swamp Creek may refer to:

In Australia
 Swamp Creek (Comerang, Eurobodalla, New South Wales), a tributary of the Tuross River in Eurobodalla Shire
 Swamp Creek (Tuross, Eurobodalla, New South Wales), a tributary of the Tuross River in Eurobodalla Shire
 Swamp Creek (Snowy River, New South Wales), a tributary of the Eucumbene River in Snowy Monaro Regional Council
 Swamp Creek (Combienbar, East Gippsland, Victoria), a tributary of the Combienbar River in East Gippsland Shire
 Swamp Creek (Mitchell, East Gippsland, Victoria), a tributary of the Mitchell River in East Gippsland Shire

In the United States
Swamp Creek (Attapulgus Creek tributary), a stream in Florida and Georgia
Swamp Creek (Missouri), a tributary of Frederick Creek
Swamp Creek (Ohio), a stream in Preble County
Swamp Creek (Pennsylvania), a tributary of Perkiomen Creek
Swamp Creek (Washington), a tributary of the Sammamish River
Swamp Creek (Wisconsin), a tributary of the Flambeau River